The Qinghai–Tibet railway or Qingzang railway, is a high-elevation railway that connects Xining, Qinghai Province, to Lhasa, Tibet Autonomous Region of China.

Construction of the  section between Xining and Golmud was completed by 1984. The  section between Golmud and Lhasa was inaugurated on 1 July 2006, by General Secretary of the Chinese Communist Party Hu Jintao: the first two passenger trains were "Qing 1" (Q1) from Golmud to Lhasa, and "Zang 2" (J2) from Lhasa to Beijing. This railway is the first that connects the Tibet Autonomous Region to any other provinces. Tibet, due to its elevation and terrain, is the last provincial level region in China to have a railway. Testing of the line and equipment started on 1 May 2006. Passenger trains run from Beijing, Chengdu, Chongqing, Guangzhou, Shanghai, Xining, and Lanzhou and can carry between 800 and 1,000 passengers during peak season.

The  New Guanjiao Tunnel is the longest tunnel between Xining and Golmud, and the  Yangbajing tunnel is the longest tunnel between Golmud and Lhasa.

The line will be electrified.

Stations 
Within the Golmud to Lhasa section of the line there are 45 stations, 38 of which are unstaffed and monitored by the control center in Xining. Thirteen more stations are planned.

Trains and tickets 

The trains are specially built for high-elevation environments. The diesel locomotives for cargo were built by CSR Qishuyan (DF8B-9000 Series) and by CNR Erqi Locomotive (DF7G-8000 Series), and the locomotives for passenger transportation were built by GE in Pennsylvania (NJ2), and the passenger carriages are Chinese-made 25T carriages: on train Z21/Z22, between Beijing West and Lhasa, Bombardier Sifang Transportation (BSP) made carriages on the Golmud-Lhasa section in deep green/yellow or deep red/yellow. Signs in the carriages are in Tibetan, Chinese, and English.

The railway from Golmud to Lhasa was completed on 12 October 2005, and it opened to regular trial service on 1 July 2006.

The locomotives are turbocharged to combat the power-reducing effect of having to run on about half an atmosphere of air due to extreme altitude.

At the beginning, only three trains ran: Beijing–Lhasa (every day), Chengdu/Chongqing–Lhasa (every other day), and Lanzhou/Xining–Lhasa. Shanghai/Guangzhou–Lhasa services were added in October 2006. In July 2010, the Shanghai–Lhasa service became daily, and a daily service between Xining and Lhasa was added, but the service was then suspended for the winter season.

Since October 2006, five pairs of passenger trains run between Golmud and Lhasa, and one more pair between Xining and Golmud. The line has a capacity of eight pairs of passenger trains.

Oxygen supply and medical issues
The passenger carriages used on Lhasa trains are specially built and have an oxygen supply for each passenger. Every passenger train has a doctor.

A Passenger Health Registration Card is required to take the train between Golmud and Lhasa. The card can be obtained when purchasing the ticket. Passengers must read the health notice for high-elevation travel and sign the agreement on the card to take the train. On 28 August 2006, a 75-year-old Hong Kong man was reported to be the first passenger to die on the train, after he had suffered heart problems in Lhasa but insisted on travelling to Xining.

Construction

The capital of the Qinghai Province, Xining, became connected with the rest of the country by rail in 1959, when the Lanqing Railway from Lanzhou was completed.

The  section of the future Qingzang Railway from Xining to Golmud, Qinghai opened to traffic in 1984. But the remaining  section from Golmud to Lhasa could not be constructed until technical difficulties of building railroad tracks on permafrost were solved. This section was formally started on 29 June 2001, finished on 12 October 2005, and signaling work and track testing took another eight months. It was completed in five years at a cost of $3.68 billion.

Track-laying in Tibet was launched from both directions, towards Tanggula Mountain and Lhasa, from Amdo railway station on 22 June 2004.

There are 44 stations, among them Tanggula Mountain railway station, at  the world's highest. The Qingzang Railway project involved more than 20,000 workers and over 6,000 pieces of industrial equipment, and is one of China's major accomplishments of the 21st century.

Bombardier Transportation built 361 high-altitude passenger carriages with special enriched-oxygen and UV-protection systems, delivered between December 2005 and May 2006. Fifty-three are luxury sleeper carriages for tourist services.

The construction of the railway was part of the China Western Development strategy, an attempt to develop the western provinces of China, which are much less developed than eastern China. The railway will be extended to Zhangmu via Shigatse to the west, and Dali via Nyingchi to the east. A further extension is planned to link Shigatse with Yadong near the China-India border (Map). The railway is considered one of the greatest feats in modern Chinese history by the government, and as a result, is often mentioned on regular TV programs. Chinese-Tibetan folk singer Han Hong has a song called Tianlu (Road to Heaven; 天路) praising the Qingzang Railway.

Completed extensions 

On 17 August 2008, a railway spokesman confirmed plans to add six more rail lines connecting to the Qinghai–Tibet railway, including from Lhasa to Nyingchi and from Lhasa to Shigatse, both in the Tibet Autonomous Region. Three lines will originate from Golmud in Qinghai province and run to Chengdu in Sichuan province, Dunhuang in Gansu province, and Korla of the Xinjiang Uygur Autonomous Region. The sixth will link Xining, the capital of Qinghai, with Zhangye in Gansu. The six lines are expected to be in operation before 2020. Construction work of the Lhasa–Shigatse extension began on 26 September 2010; it was opened in August 2014.

The construction of Dunhuang–Golmud railway began in December 2012 and finished on 18 December 2019. This new railway extends the existed Yinmaxia station on the Qinghai–Tibet Railway  to Dunhuang, Gansu, establishing a direct connection between Xinjiang and Tibet.

Addition of capacity and electrification 

Given that the Sichuan-Tibet railway is expected to be completed relatively later with less capacity, the Qinghai–Tibet railway is expected to add cargo capacity to fulfill the demand of material transportation. 13 stations along the Qinghai–Tibet railway have received extensions of sidings or passing loops, or these were built from scratch. This will allow the daily train received from Lhasa Railway station to expand from 6 to 12-14. An electrification feasibility study is also in progress.

Connection to Nepal

In a meeting between Chinese and Nepalese officials on 25 April 2008, the Chinese delegation announced the intention to extend the Qingzang railway to Zhangmu (Nepali: Khasa) on the Nepalese border. Nepal had requested that the railway be extended to enable trade and tourism between the two nations. The section Lhasa-Shigatse opened in August 2014. In June 2018, China and Nepal signed a series of agreements including the construction of Shigatse-Kathmandu railway during Nepali prime minister Oli's visit to China. Construction is expected to be complete by 2024.

Future Expansions

In 2010, a Chinese Ministry of Railways spokesman announced that it would be extending the Qinghai–Tibet Railway southward to Shigatse, but it has yet to confirm an extension to India, Bangladesh and other railway networks.

The extension to the Shigatse region and Nyingchi has been confirmed by the relevant government departments in Tibet. The Qinghai–Tibet Railway will be connecting close to India. An official in charge of the Tibet Autonomous Region Development and Reform Commission had pointed out: "Tibet Railway is completed, with Lhasa as the basis, will be built east of Lhasa to Nyingchi line from Lhasa to Shigatse west building line of the south building of the Qinghai-Tibet Shigatse to East Asia and other three Railway Line. These extensions will be opened to traffic within a decade. then, the three railway extension will form a large Y-shape, the length will be over two thousand kilometers".

There is no viable prospect of the railway being extended to India.

Engineering challenges 

There are many technical difficulties for such a railway. About half of the second section was built on barely permanent permafrost. In the summer, the uppermost layer thaws, and the ground becomes muddy. The heat from the trains passing above is able to melt the permafrost even with a small change in temperature. The main engineering challenge, aside from oxygen shortages, is the weakness of the permafrost. For areas of permafrost that are not very fragile, an embankment of large rocks is sufficient. Meanwhile, in the most fragile areas, the rail bed must be elevated like a bridge. The engineers dealt with this problem in the areas of weakest permafrost by building elevated tracks with pile-driven foundations sunk deep into the ground. Similar to the Trans-Alaska Pipeline System, portions of the track are also passively cooled with ammonia-based heat exchangers.

Due to climate change, temperatures in the Tibetan Plateau may be considered to increase by an estimated two to three degrees Celsius. This change is sufficient to melt the permafrost and thereby affect the integrity of the entire system. The effects of climate change have yet to be seen.

The air in Tibet is much thinner, with oxygen partial pressure being 35% to 40% below that at sea level. Special passenger carriages are used, and several oxygen factories were built along the railway. Each seat in the train is equipped with an oxygen supply outlet for any possible emergency. The Chinese government claimed that no construction workers died during the construction due to altitude sickness related diseases. The railway passes the Kunlun Mountains, an earthquake zone. The 7.8  Kunlun earthquake struck in 2001 (but caused no fatalities). Dozens of earthquake monitors have been installed along the railway.

Impact

Economic 
With limited industrial capacity in Tibet, the Tibetan economy heavily relies on industrial products from more developed parts of China. Transport of goods in and out of Tibet was mostly through the Qingzang Highway connecting Tibet to the adjacent Qinghai province, which was built in the early 1950s. The length and terrain have limited the capacity of the highway, with less than 1 million tons of goods transported each year. With the construction of the Qingzang railway, the cost of transportation of both passengers and goods should be greatly reduced, allowing for an increase in volume—the cost per tonne-kilometer will be reduced from 0.38 RMB to 0.12 RMB. It is projected that by 2010, 2.8 million tons will be carried to and from Tibet, with over 75% carried by the railway. Before the railway, the purchasing power of 100 RMB in Lhasa was only commensurate with 54 RMB in coastal regions of China, mainly due to high transport costs. The railway could elevate living standards along the route.

Social 
As reported by Xinhua News, the Qingzang railway has promoted the inheritance of Tibetan culture and religion, as the opening of the railway has increased the number of worshippers from all over the country coming to Lhasa. It also advantages Tibetans with accessibility to the rest part of China for tertiary education, employment, and market for local industries. Qiangba Puncog, former Chairman of the Tibet Autonomous Region People's Government, has appreciated the railway for introducing more tourism industries to the region with jobs for the local people.
Environmentalists and Tibetan independence activists protested against the construction of the railway. The Tibetan government-in-exile believes that the line and the further expansion of the rail network will contribute to further influx of Chinese people, the de-nationalization of Tibetans and the depletion of the region's natural resources.

Environmental 

The environmental impact of the new railway is an ongoing concern. The increase in passenger traffic will result in greater tourism and economic activity on the Tibetan Plateau, and the construction of the railway may also negatively impact the local environment. For example, interference on earth, vegetation, and surface water heat exchange, which may cause freeze-thaw erosion and melting of ice if not handled properly. 
To reduce the interference, trash and excrement on the trains are collected into two sealed containers in each car, instead of disposing them on the tracks, and are taken out at large stations. There are also concerns from the China Meteorological Administration that melting, due to global warming, of the permafrost in Tibet on which part of the railway is placed may threaten the railway within the 21st century.

The effects of this railway on wild animals such as Tibetan antelope and plants are currently unknown. 33 wildlife crossing railway bridges were constructed specifically to allow continued animal migration.

Military 

Commentators have noted the potential military impact of this railway as permitting the People's Liberation Army more rapid troop mobilization to certain border areas in dispute with India.

Rolling stock 

 361 Bombardier Sifang Power (Qingdao) Transportation Ltd./Power Corporation of Canada/China South Locomotive and Rolling Stock Industry (Group) Corporation High-Grade Coach – 308 standard cars and 53 special tourist cars
 GE Transportation NJ2 locomotive (78 GE designation C38AChe locomotives were built)
 CSR Qishuyan & CSR Ziyang Locomotive Factory DF8B-9000 series and DF8BJ locomotive – similar to the Bombardier Transportation-GE Transportation Blue Tiger diesel electric locomotive; production of DF8B-9000 series were suspended by former Chinese corrupted official Liu Zhijun in favor of GE and EMD locomotives
 CNR Erqi Locomotive DF7G-8000 series locomotive
 CRRC Dalian HXN3 locomotive

Scenery along the railway 
Since the opening of Qingzang Railway, scenery as viewed from the railway has become internationally famous:

Xining to Golmud: 
 Qinghai Lake
Golmud to Lhasa: 
 Kunlun Pass, the east part of Kunlun Mountains (Hoh Xil Mountains to Bayan Har Mountains), Yuzhu Peak and its Glacier
 Fenghuoshan Tunnel
 Kekexili Grassland

 Tuotuo River Bridge
 Tanggula railway station, Tanggula Mountains
 Amdo Grassland
 Tsonag Lake
 Nagchu Grassland
 Nyenchen Tanglha Mountains
 Damxung Grassland
 Lhasa River Bridge

Gallery

See also 

 List of highest railways
 Sichuan–Tibet railway

References 
36. Xining to Lhasa Train schedule & price - Travel Tibet China

 M.W.H., Railroad in the clouds, Trains March 2002
 Forbes – The Tibet Train: Rocket To The Roof

Further reading

External links 

Railway lines in China
Mountain railways
Rail transport in Tibet
Rail transport in Qinghai
Railway lines opened in 2006
2006 establishments in China